Mount Cahill is one of the Sky-Hi Nunataks in Palmer Land, rising to  east-northeast of Mount Carrara. It was named in 1987 by the Advisory Committee on Antarctic Names after Laurence J. Cahill, Jr., physicist, University of Minnesota; Principal Investigator in upper atmospheric physics at Siple Station and South Pole Station for many years from 1973.

References
 

Mountains of Palmer Land